David Hardy may refer to:

 David T. Hardy (born 1951), American author and attorney
 David A. Hardy (born 1936), British artist and illustrator
 David Hardy (cricketer) (1877–1951), English cricketer

See also
David Hardie (physician) (1856–1945), doctor
David Hardie (politician) (1860s–1939), British politician